Planet X is a 1998 Star Trek novel by Michael Jan Friedman that is a crossover between the X-Men comic book series and the characters of Star Trek: The Next Generation. A New York Times bestseller, it was a sequel to an earlier crossover, detailed in the Marvel Comics one-shot Star Trek: The Next Generation/X-Men #1 (which was itself similar to an earlier Star Trek/X-Men crossover comic, where a slightly different team of X-Men encountered the characters of the original Star Trek series). The novel hinted at an attraction between Jean-Luc Picard and Ororo Munroe (Storm) and made a forward-looking reference to the (then-uncast) X-Men feature film by remarking on the uncanny resemblance between Picard and Xavier, as the two converse via the holodeck after a reasonable facsimile of Xavier is programmed into it; (both characters were played by Patrick Stewart in Star Trek: The Next Generation and the X-Men film series).

See also
Star Trek crossovers

References

External links

1998 novels
Crossover novels
Marvel Comics novels
Novels by Michael Jan Friedman
Novels based on Star Trek: The Next Generation
X-Men
Pocket Books books
Novels about discrimination